Ben J. Pierce (born February 19, 1999), also known as Miss Benny, is an American singer, YouTuber and actor.

Early life 
Ben J. Pierce was born in Dallas, Texas on February 19, 1999. They lived as a closeted teenager before coming out. As Pierce began posting on YouTube, they found an outlet with other similar individuals in the online community. They befriended fellow YouTube artists Troye Sivan and Tyler Oakley.

Career 
Pierce began posting on YouTube using various channels when they were 11 years old in 2010 as a way to feel less isolated and lonely. In 2012, they began posting under the YouTube channel, KidPOV. They began posting under their own name in 2016. They frequently discuss gender and identity. Pierce has done makeup tutorials and collaborated with other media personalities including Tyler Oakley and James Charles. Their YouTube channel also includes humorous skits.

In 2014, Pierce released the song "Little Game". They wrote the lyrics and directed and produced the music video with assistance from Tumi Mphahlele. The song and video rebuff forcing children into traditional gender roles.

In 2016, Pierce was cast as Smiley in season 2 of go90's Guidance.

Pierce also produces music under the name Miss Benny. Pierce released the single "Boys Will Be Boys" in 2016. The song's music video was filmed and edited by YouTuber and filmmaker Chase vs Everything. Kalama Epstein is featured in the music video. The song is about toxic masculinity and heteronormativity. It features melodic tones, smooth vocals, and drum beats. Nic Kelly of Project U had a positive review of the song, describing its style as somewhere between Odesza and Drumaq.

In 2017, Pierce released the single "Never Apart". They directed the video which was shot by Chase vs Everything. The video earned praise from Project U which described it as having a "90s vibe." Kelley of Project U describes the song as an dark R&B track similar to Leland and Tom Aspaul.

In 2017, Pierce was managed by Lisa Filipelli of Flip Management.

In 2018, Pierce appeared in the sitcom Fuller House as Casey, the shows first openly gay character. They were cast in the series Reverie. In 2019, they were cast as the lead for The CW pilot Glamorous playing Marco, an "ambitious and creative gender-nonconforming teenager who uses makeup and fashion to let his queer self bloom."

Pierce is the voice of Angel in Craig of the Creek since season 4.

Artistry 
Pierce names Bob Mizer as one of their aesthetic influences. They strive to create music that is glittery synth-pop, bubbly, and "very gay and very queer." Pierce listens to pop musicians Charli XCX and Carly Rae Jepsen. They also listen to rap and hip hop. Pierce often goes by the nickname Miss Benny to portray a masculine but still feminine image.

Personal life 
Pierce lives in Los Angeles, California . 

Pierce identifies as gay, queer, and non-binary.   They use they/them, she/her, and he/him pronouns. 

They have 3 older siblings who assist in aspects of video production including crafting props and design hair and makeup.

Discography

Singles 
 "Little Game" (2014)
 "Boys Will Be Boys" (2016)
 "Never Apart" (2017)
 "Rendezvous" (2019)
 "Every Boy" (2019)
 "That's My Man" (2019)
 "One Damn Good Mistake" (2019)

Filmography

See also 
 LGBT culture in Dallas–Fort Worth
 LGBT culture in Los Angeles
 List of LGBT YouTubers

References

External links 
 

Living people
1999 births
21st-century American singers
American male singer-songwriters
LGBT people from Texas
Musicians from Dallas
LGBT YouTubers
YouTubers from Texas
Beauty and makeup YouTubers
Music YouTubers
American child singers
Singer-songwriters from Texas
American gay musicians
Queer musicians
Non-binary musicians
American gay actors
Queer actors
20th-century LGBT people
21st-century LGBT people
YouTube channels launched in 2011
American LGBT singers